"Are You Satisfied?" is a song written by Homer Escamilla and Sheb Wooley and performed by Rusty Draper featuring the Jack Halloran Singers. It reached #11 in the U.S. in 1956.

The song's orchestra was conducted by David Carroll.

Other charting versions
Wooley released a version of the song as a single in 1955 which reached #95 in the U.S.
Ann Cole released a version of the song as a single in 1956 which reached #10 on the U.S. R&B chart.
Toni Arden released a version of the song as a single in 1956 which reached #78 in the U.S.
Janie Fricke released a version of the song as a single in 1987 which reached #32 on the U.S. country chart.

Other versions
Connie Francis released a version of the song as a single in 1955, but it did not chart.
Jimmy Wakely and Gloria Wood released a version of the song as a single in 1955, but it did not chart.
Clint Eastwood released a version of the song on his 1962 album Cowboy Favorites.
Jimmy Walker released a version of the song as the B-side to his 1965 single "The Legend of Skull Lake".

References

1955 songs
1955 singles
1956 singles
1987 singles
Songs written by Sheb Wooley
Connie Francis songs
Clint Eastwood songs
Jimmy Wakely songs
Mercury Records singles
MGM Records singles
RCA Victor singles
Columbia Records singles
Decca Records singles